The Lepashe River is a natural watercourse in Botswana. It shares its name with the village of Lepashe, through which the river flows. The Lepashe River discharges to the Sua Pan. There are significant gravel resources along some reaches of the Lepashe River.

See also
 Makgadikgadi Pans

References
 Botswana Geological Survey Dept, District Memoir no. 1, published by Federation of Malaya
 C. Michael Hogan (2008) Makgadikgadi, The Megalithic Portal, ed. A. Burnham

Line notes

Rivers of Botswana